The 1978 PBA Invitational Championship was the third conference of the 1978 PBA season. It started on November 25 and ended on December 14, 1978.

The Toyota Tamaraws retains the Invitational crown with a 3–1 series victory over first-time finalist Tanduay Esquires.

Format
The following format will be observed for the duration of the tournament:
 Top five teams in the first two conferences are qualified in the Invitational championship.
 The top two teams at the end of the single round eliminations advance to the best-of-five finals. The third and fourth-place finishers play in the best-of-five series for third place.

Elimination round

Battle for third

Finals

References

External links

PBA Invitational Championship
Invitational Championship